Bellisario is an Italian surname. Notable people with the surname include:

Andrew E. Bellisario (born 1956), American Roman Catholic bishop
Donald P. Bellisario (born 1935), American television producer and screenwriter
Giuseppe Bellisario (1821–1896), Italian painter
Michael Bellisario (born 1980), American actor
Troian Bellisario (born 1985), American actress

See also
Belisario, an 1836 opera by Gaetano Donizetti

Italian-language surnames